Redwine may refer to:

People with the surname
David Redwine, American politician
Jarvis Redwine, American football player
John Redwine, American physician and politician
Jon Redwine, American music producer
Mike Redwine, American football coach
Sheldrick Redwine (born 1996), American football player
Timothy Redwine (born 1983), American television actor

Places
Redwine, California, former settlement in Mendocino County, California, United States
Redwine, Kentucky, United States
Redwine, Tennessee, Cocke County, United States

See also
Red wine